Sidi Ahmed Ou Moussa, also spelled Sidi Ahmad u Musa (1460 - 1563) was a marabout, Muslim saint and spiritual leader of Tazerwalt in the Sous region of Morocco.

Biography 
Sidi Ahmed Ou Moussa Al Jazouli Al Semlali was born in the mid-15th century around 1460 in Bou Merouan, a small town in Ida Ou Semlal in the Anti-Atlas mountains. His father is Sidi Moussa and mother is Lalla Taounnout which makes him a descendant of Sidi Zouzal Jazouli.

Young, he moved to Marrakech to study Islam before extensively travelling to the places such as the Orient for a long period of time. In 1521, he returned to Ilmatene, a small town in the Sous before settling in Tazerwalt. He founded the Tazerwalt dynasty where he established an Islamic zawiya and attracted hundreds of followers to receive his religious mystical teachings.

Sidi Ahmed maintained good relations with the ruling Saadian dynasty and was able to use his religious standing to carve out an enclave of power within the Saadian state. Following his death in 1563, his grave became a pilgrimage site, and his offspring inherited much of the wealth and status he had acquired as a spiritual leader. His grandson Bu-Dmia continued as the emir of Tazerwalt, a short lived dynasty centered in Iligh before its fall to the Alaouites.

Legacy 

After his death in 1563, a mausoleum was built in the zawiya and remains as a pilgrimage site in the village of Sidi Ahmed Ou Moussa, which shares his name.

Since the early 20th century, his name has been associated with groups of acrobatic entertainers called Oulad Sidi Ahmed ou Moussa, and the yearly pilgrimage (or moussem). They are mentioned by George Borrow in The Zincali.

See also 
 Tazerwalt
 Sidi Ahmed Ou Moussa (village)
 Muhammad al-Jazuli

References 

1460 births
1563 deaths
15th-century Berber people
16th-century Berber people
Moroccan Sufi saints
Berber scholars
Shilha people